Nord-Ouest (French for northwest) may refer to:
 Nord-Ouest (department), Haiti
 Territoires du Nord-Ouest, Canada
 North-West France (European Parliament constituency)
 Northwest Region (Cameroon) (Région du Nord-Ouest)

See also 
 
 
 Northwest (disambiguation)
 Northwestern Province (disambiguation)
 Nord-Est (disambiguation) (northeast)
 Sud-Ouest (disambiguation) (southwest)
 Sud-Est (disambiguation) (southeast)